Sean David Longstaff (born 30 October 1997) is an English professional footballer who plays for Premier League club Newcastle United as a midfielder.

Career
Longstaff began his career with the youth team of Newcastle United. He moved on loan to Scottish Premiership club Kilmarnock in January 2017, along with Callum Roberts and Freddie Woodman. He signed on loan for Blackpool in July 2017.

Longstaff impressed manager Rafa Benítez in pre-season and was rewarded with a four-year contract in November 2018. Longstaff made his competitive first team debut against Nottingham Forest in the Carabao Cup in August 2018, before making his Premier League debut as a second-half substitute against Liverpool at Anfield the following December.  This was followed up by his first goal in the FA Cup replay against Blackburn Rovers before he put in a memorable performance by winning the penalty that gave Newcastle a 2–1 win over champions Manchester City in January 2019.	

On 26 February 2019, Longstaff scored his first Premier League goal for Newcastle in a 2–0 win over Burnley.

In March 2019, Longstaff was ruled out for the rest of the 2018–19 season following a knee ligament injury. On 31 January 2023, he scored a brace in a 2–1 win over Southampton in the EFL Cup semi-final second leg to qualify his club to their first final since 1999.

Personal life
Raised in North Shields, Longstaff's younger brother Matty is a footballer who also plays for Newcastle United. 
Their father David is a former Great Britain ice hockey player, who featured over 100 times for the national side, and is still active as coach for the Whitley Warriors. David Longstaff is also the cousin of former England international Alan Thompson. They are not related to former Newcastle academy player Luis Longstaff. 

Longstaff's father stated that both Sean and Matty are lifelong fans of Newcastle United.

Career statistics

Honours
Newcastle United
EFL Cup runner-up: 2022–23

References

1997 births
Living people
Sportspeople from North Shields
Footballers from Tyne and Wear
English footballers
Association football midfielders
Newcastle United F.C. players
Kilmarnock F.C. players
Blackpool F.C. players
Scottish Professional Football League players
English Football League players
Premier League players